Greenhills is a suburb of New Zealand's southernmost city, Invercargill.

A quaint but sturdy community with a lush grasslands and home of the "THREE SISTERS". landmark of three mountains visible from Invercargill and surrounding lands.

Demographics
Greenhills is part of the Woodend-Greenhills statistical area.

References

Suburbs of Invercargill